Shisheh Gurab (also Romanized as Shīsheh Gūrāb and Shisheh Goorab; also known as Shishkurab) is a village in Nowsher-e Koshk-e Bijar Rural District, Khoshk-e Bijar District, Rasht County, Gilan Province, Iran. At the 2006 census, its population was 479, in 142 families.

References 

Populated places in Rasht County